Shalili, also rendered as Shahaili, may refer to:
 Shalili-ye Bozorg
 Shalili-ye Kuchek